The 2010 Commodore Cup National Series was the 17th running of the Commodore Cup. It began on 7 March 2010, at Wakefield Park and ended on 24 October 2010, at Sandown Raceway. The series was won by Adam Beechey, winning two rounds during the season, sharing one with Dean Crosswell in the Winton round. No other driver won more than one round, as the other four rounds were split between championship runner-up Tony Bates, third-placed Nick Parker, Brett Holdsworth and Marcus Zukanovic.

Teams and drivers
The following drivers and teams competed in the 2010 Commodore Cup National Series.

* - driver competed in practice only.
** - driver competed in qualifying and race only.

Calendar
The 2010 Commodore Cup National Series consisted of six rounds.

Points system

1 bonus point is awarded for qualifying on pole position.
Each non-finisher will be awarded a points total that is 10 less than the points they would have been awarded if they had finished the race in the same position.

Series standings

Bold indicates that the driver scored one bonus point for qualifying on pole.

References

Commodore Cup
Commodore Cup